Michael Thomas Hannan (born July 14, 1943) is an American sociologist, and professor of management at the Stanford Graduate School of Business, known for his seminal work in the field of organizational ecology.

Biography 
Hannan received his B.A. at the College of the Holy Cross in 1965, his M.A. at the University of North Carolina, Chapel Hill, in 1968, where he also obtained his Ph.D in sociology in 1970.

Hannan started his academic career as assistant professor of sociology at Stanford University, where he got promoted to professor of sociology. In 1984 he moved to Cornell University, where he was appointed professor of social sciences. In 1991 he moved back to Stanford to become professor of management and professor of sociology, and since 2015 emeritus.

Among others he was awarded a Guggenheim Fellowships in sociology in 1987, and a Max Weber Award by the American Sociological Association in 1992 and 2002.

Work

Organizational ecology 

Hannan and John H. Freeman were the first to formulate an explicit organizational theory about population ecology with the 1977 article in the American Journal of Sociology, which was the seminal work in the field of organizational ecology. This article proposed: 

... [a] population ecology perspective on organization-environment relations... as an alternative to the dominant adaptation perspective. The strength of inertial pressures on organizational structure suggests the application of models that depend on competition and selection in populations of organizations. Several such models, as well as issues arising in attempts to apply them to the organization-environment problem, are discussed. 

The scope of their organizational ecology theory ranged from birth of new organizations (organizational founding), organizational growth and organizational change, to the death of organizations (firm mortality). Organizations compete in their environment, where processes like natural selection rule.

Selected publications 
 Hannan, Michael T., and Glenn R. Carroll. Dynamics of organizational populations: Density, legitimation, and competition. Oxford University Press, 1992.
 Hannan, Michael T., and John H. Freeman. Organizational ecology. Harvard University Press, 1993.

Articles, a selection
 Hannan, Michael T., and John H. Freeman. The population ecology of organizations. American journal of sociology 82.5 (1977): 929-964.
 Hannan, Michael T., and John H. Freeman. Structural inertia and organizational change. American sociological review (1984): 149-164.

Awards and honors 

 Fellow, American Academy of Arts and Sciences, 1991
Max Weber Award, American Sociological Association, 2002
Max Weber Award, American Sociological Association, 1991
 Distinguished Scholar, Organization Theory and Management Division, Academy of Management, 1991
 Best Paper Award in Mathematical Sociology, American Sociological Association, 2003
 Theorodology Prize, Princeton Sociology Department, 2014

References

External links 

 Michael T. Hannan, Stanford Graduate School of Business

Living people
1943 births
American sociologists
American organizational theorists
Cornell University faculty